Hedyotis (starviolet) is a genus of flowering plants in the family Rubiaceae. Many species of this genus such as Hedyotis biflora, H. corymbosa and H. diffusa are well known medicinal plants. Hedyotis is native to tropical and subtropical Asia and to islands of the northwest Pacific. It comprises about 115 species. The type species for the genus is Hedyotis fruticosa.

Hedyotis was named by Carl Linnaeus in 1753 in Species Plantarum. This generic name is derived from two Greek words, hedys, "sweet", and otos, "ear", in reference to the sweet-scented, ear-shaped leaves of some species.

Taxonomy
Hedyotis was formerly defined very broadly by some authors, and included species now placed in Oldenlandia, Oldenlandiopsis, Houstonia, Kadua, and other genera. It is now circumscribed more narrowly, as a monophyletic group that is closely related to Agathisanthemum.

The genus Pleiocraterium was erected  by Bremekamp with Hedyotis verticillaris moved to it as P. verticillare along with the species P. plantaginifolium from Sri Lanka, P. sumatranum and P. gentianifolium, both of Sumatra. Molecular phylogenetic studies however have found this genus to nest within other representatives of the genus Hedyotis with little support for a separate genus.

Species
, Plants of the World Online accepted the following species:

Hedyotis acutangula Champ. ex Benth.
Hedyotis aimiriikensis Kaneh.
Hedyotis albonerva Bedd.
Hedyotis articularis R.Br. ex Wight & Arn.
Hedyotis atropurpurea Merr.
Hedyotis austrosinica L.Wu & L.H.Yang
Hedyotis bahaii J.F.Maxwell
Hedyotis bambusetorum Merr.
Hedyotis baotingensis W.C.Ko
Hedyotis barberi (Gamble) A.N.Henry & Subr.
Hedyotis beddomei Hook.f.
Hedyotis benguetensis (Elmer) Elmer
Hedyotis bourdillonii (Gamble) R.S.Rao & Hemadri ex N.C.Nair, V.J.Nair & R.Ansari
Hedyotis brachyantha Merr.
Hedyotis bracteosa Hance
Hedyotis buxifolia Bedd.
Hedyotis cagayanensis Merr.
Hedyotis camarinensis Merr.
Hedyotis cantoniensis F.C.How ex W.C.Ko
Hedyotis cardiophylla Quisumb. & Merr.
Hedyotis catanduanensis Merr.
Hedyotis cathayana W.C.Ko
Hedyotis caudata Merr.
Hedyotis caudatifolia Merr. & F.P.Metcalf
Hedyotis ceylanica N.Wikstr. & Neupane
Hedyotis cheniana R.J.Wang
Hedyotis cinereoviridis Thwaites
Hedyotis communis W.C.Ko
Hedyotis coprosmoides Trimen
Hedyotis cornifolia Kaneh.
Hedyotis cryptantha Dunn
Hedyotis cushingiae Fosberg
Hedyotis cyanantha Kurz
Hedyotis cyanescens Thwaites
Hedyotis decora E.T.Geddes
Hedyotis dendroides Alston
Hedyotis densa Craib
Hedyotis devicolamensis Deb & Ratna Dutta
Hedyotis diffusissima Merr.
Hedyotis divaricata (Valeton) Hosok.
Hedyotis edanoii Quisumb. & Merr.
Hedyotis effusa Hance
Hedyotis equisetiformis Wernham
Hedyotis eualata (Gamble) A.N.Henry & Subr.
Hedyotis eucapitata Merr.
Hedyotis evenia Thwaites
Hedyotis exserta Merr.
Hedyotis fissistipula Merr.
Hedyotis flavescens Thwaites
Hedyotis flexuosa Ridl.
Hedyotis fruticosa L.
Hedyotis fruticulosa (Volkens) Merr.
Hedyotis fumata Alston
Hedyotis gamblei A.N.Henry & Subr.
Hedyotis gardneri Thwaites
Hedyotis garrettii Craib
Hedyotis gartmorensis Ridsdale
Hedyotis gentianifolia (Bremek.) N.Wikstr. & Neupane
Hedyotis globiceps Ridl.
Hedyotis griffithii Hook.f.
Hedyotis hainanensis (Chun) W.C.Ko
Hedyotis hamiguitanensis Santor, D.D.B.Santiago & Alejandro
Hedyotis havilandii King
Hedyotis hirsutissima Bedd.
Hedyotis humilis Merr.
Hedyotis inamoena Thwaites
Hedyotis indirae K.M.P.Kumar & Aiswarya
Hedyotis kamputensis (Pit.) Wangwasit & Chantar.
Hedyotis korrorensis (Valeton) Hosok.
Hedyotis kottangathattiensis M.B.Viswan. & Manik.
Hedyotis kurzii Merr.
Hedyotis laciniata Kaneh.
Hedyotis lancea Thunb. ex Maxim.
Hedyotis laotica (Pit.) Wangwasit & Chantar.
Hedyotis lawsoniae Wight & Arn.
Hedyotis leschenaultiana DC.
Hedyotis lessertiana Arn.
Hedyotis leuserensis N.Wikstr. & Neupane
Hedyotis loganioides Benth.
Hedyotis longiexserta Merr. & F.P.Metcalf
Hedyotis longipedunculata Merr.
Hedyotis longipetala Merr.
Hedyotis luzoniensis Merr.
Hedyotis lychnidifolia Craib
Hedyotis macgregorii Merr.
Hedyotis macraei Hook.f.
Hedyotis macrophylla Wall. ex Wight & Arn.
Hedyotis macrostegia Stapf
Hedyotis maingayi Hook.f.
Hedyotis marginata (Thwaites ex Trimen) Alston
Hedyotis matthewii Dunn
Hedyotis megalantha Merr.
Hedyotis membranacea Thwaites
Hedyotis mindorensis Quisumb.
Hedyotis minutopuberula Merr. & F.P.Metcalf
Hedyotis montana Merr.
Hedyotis nairii Murug. & V.Balas.
Hedyotis nankunshanensis R.J.Wang & S.J.Deng
Hedyotis nanlingensis R.J.Wang
Hedyotis neesiana Arn.
Hedyotis neolessertiana Ridsdale
Hedyotis nigrescens Merr.
Hedyotis nodiflora Wall. ex G.Don
Hedyotis nodulosa Arn.
Hedyotis novoguineensis Merr. & L.M.Perry
Hedyotis nutans (Valeton) P.Royen
Hedyotis obscura Thwaites
Hedyotis oligantha Merr.
Hedyotis ovalis (Korth.) Walp.
Hedyotis ovata Thunb. ex Maxim.
Hedyotis papafranciscoi Alejandro
Hedyotis paridifolia Dunn
Hedyotis patens Ridl.
Hedyotis phanerophlebia Merr.
Hedyotis philippensis (Willd. ex Spreng.) Merr. ex C.B.Rob.
Hedyotis pilosissima Merr.
Hedyotis pinaster Ridl.
Hedyotis plantaginifolia Arn.
Hedyotis ponapensis (Valeton) Kaneh.
Hedyotis prostrata Blume
Hedyotis protrusa Stapf
Hedyotis pruinosa Wight & Arn.
Hedyotis puberulifolia Y.D.Xu & R.J.Wang
Hedyotis pubescens (Valeton) Merr. & L.M.Perry
Hedyotis puffii Wangwasit & Chantar.
Hedyotis pulchella Stapf
Hedyotis pulcherrima Dunn
Hedyotis punicea Craib
Hedyotis purpurascens Hook.f.
Hedyotis quinquinervia Thwaites
Hedyotis rajasekaranii Karupp. & V.Ravich.
Hedyotis ramarowii (Gamble) R.S.Rao & Hemadri
Hedyotis resupinata Ridl.
Hedyotis rhinophylla Thwaites ex Trimen
Hedyotis rigida (Blume) Walp.
Hedyotis rivalis Ridl.
Hedyotis rosmarinifolia (Pit.) Craib
Hedyotis rugosa (Blume) Korth.
Hedyotis sachetiana Fosberg
Hedyotis scaberrima Merr.
Hedyotis scaberula Hook.f.
Hedyotis scabridifolia Kaneh.
Hedyotis schlechteri Merr. & L.M.Perry
Hedyotis scoparia (Pierre ex Pit.) P.H.Hô
Hedyotis shenzhenensis Tao Chen
Hedyotis shettyi K.Ravik. & V.Lakshm.
Hedyotis shoolamudi Sunil, Naveen Kum. & K.M.P.Kumar
Hedyotis sibuyanensis Elmer
Hedyotis similis E.T.Geddes
Hedyotis simplex Merr.
Hedyotis simplicissima (Lour.) Merr.
Hedyotis sithiravaraiensis Muruganand., Devanath., S.Ravik. & D.Naras.
Hedyotis srilankensis Deb & Ratna Dutta
Hedyotis stelligera Ridl.
Hedyotis stylosa R.Br. ex Wight & Arn.
Hedyotis suborthogona Hosok.
Hedyotis subvelutina Elmer
Hedyotis subvenosa Merr.
Hedyotis subverticillata Alston
Hedyotis swertioides Hook.f.
Hedyotis symphyllarionoides Ridsdale
Hedyotis taishanensis G.T.Wang & R.J.Wang
Hedyotis tavoyensis N.P.Balakr.
Hedyotis tenuipes Hemsl.
Hedyotis terminaliflora Merr. & Chun
Hedyotis ternata (Pierre ex Pit.) P.H.Hô
Hedyotis tetrandra (Roxb.) Craib
Hedyotis tetrangularis (Korth.) Walp.
Hedyotis thwaitesii Hook.f.
Hedyotis tomentosa (Valeton) Hosok.
Hedyotis tonggulingensis G.B.Jiang & R.J.Wang
Hedyotis travancorica Bedd.
Hedyotis trichoneura Alston
Hedyotis tridentata Ridsdale
Hedyotis trimenii Deb & Ratna Dutta
Hedyotis trisecta Elmer
Hedyotis tuyamae Hosok.
Hedyotis uncinella Hook. & Arn.
Hedyotis vachellii Hook. & Arn.
Hedyotis valetoniana Merr. & L.M.Perry
Hedyotis verticillaris Wall. ex Wight & Arn.
Hedyotis wangii R.J.Wang
Hedyotis whiteheadii Merr.
Hedyotis wuzhishanensis R.J.Wang
Hedyotis xinyiensis X.Guo & R.J.Wang
Hedyotis yangchunensis W.C.Ko & Zhang
Hedyotis yazhouensis F.W.Xing & R.J.Wang
Hedyotis zhihaoana Huan C.Wang & Xiao Lan Liu

Research

In traditional medicine, over 20 Hedyotis species have been used for treatment of diseases and in healing practices. They are taken for treatment of cancers, infections and other diseases. Phytochemical investigation of Hedyotis species was first published in 1933 upon examining the active components of the medicinal plant H. auricularia. Since then, over 50 novel compounds have been isolated from various member of the genus Hedyotis. These compounds have highly divergent structures including alkaloids, anthraquinones, flavonoids, iridoids, triterpenoids, sterols, lignans and a number of other compounds.

Recently, two novel biological active peptides, hedyotide B1 and B2 (hedyotide = hedyotis + peptide), have been isolated from the ariel parts of the medicinal plant Hedyotis biflora. H. biflora is a small annual herb traditionally used to treat body pain in fever and malaria. Both hedyotide B1 and B2 belong to the cyclotide superfamily which was known to be an important part of plant innate defense. Hedyotide B1 has a cyclic-cystine-knot motif and displayed potent broad-spectrum activities against many bacteria including E. coli, S. salivarius, S. aureus, P. aeruginosa, B. cereus and B. megaterium. Hedyotide B1 and cyclotides are likely to exerted their antimicrobial actions by disrupting the bacteria membranes which eventually leads to cell death. As they target directly bacterial membranes. it is unlikely for bacteria to develop resistance. Therefore, hedyotide B1 with a novel mode of action has potential as a novel antimicrobial agent against drug-resistance bacteria.

References

External links
 Hedyotis At: Search Page At: World Checklist of Rubiaceae At: Index by Team At: Projects At: Science Directory At: Scientific Research and Data At: Kew Gardens
 Hedyotis At:Index Nominum Genericorum At: References At: NMNH Department of Botany
 Hedyotis In: volume I Of: Species Plantarum At: Titles At: Biodiversity Heritage Library

 
Rubiaceae genera